Albert Linder (13 January 1996 – 17 September 2021) was a Kazakh weightlifter who competed in the men's 69 kg weight category.

Personal life
Albert Linder was born on 13 January 1996, in Taldykorgan. He was the brother of Semen Linder, who is also a weightlifter. His family is of German descent.

Career
Linder competed at world championships, including at the 2013 and 2014 World Weightlifting Championships. He also participated in the men's 69 kg class at 2017 Asian Weightlifting Championships in Ashgabat, Turkmenistan. He won gold - snatched 148 kg and jerked an additional 187 kg for a total of 335 kg. He won the golden medal of the 2017 Summer Universiade in the 69 kg weight category. He lifted 333 kg (148+185) in the double event.

Death
Albert Linder died on September 17, 2021 at the age of 25,  allegedly as a result of committing suicide.

Major results

References

1996 births
2021 deaths
Kazakhstani male weightlifters
Universiade medalists in weightlifting
Universiade gold medalists for Kazakhstan
Medalists at the 2017 Summer Universiade
People from Taldykorgan
Kazakhstani people of German descent
21st-century Kazakhstani people